The Nokia X7-00 is a Symbian^3 smartphone from the Nokia Xseries. It is the first Xseries phone with Nokia's Symbian^3 platform and it shipped with the Anna update. It is also the successor to X6, which was the previous multimedia touchscreen phone, with similar features and specifications in the series. The X7-00 was announced on 12 April 2011, alongside the Nokia E6.

Features 
 WCDMA
 Size: 119.7 × 62.8 × 11.9mm
 Display: 4.0-inch; AMOLED, 16 million colors. 
 Screen resolution: 640x360 pixels (184ppi) 
 Scratch-resistant capacitive touchscreen
 Integrated and Assisted GPS
 Wireless LAN (Wi-Fi)

Other services, features or applications 
 Calendar, Contacts, Music player, Internet, Messaging, Photos, Videos, Web TV, Office documents viewers, Mail and Radio
 OVI services: Ovi store, Ovi map, Nokia Ovi suite, Nokia Ovi Player

Operating times
 Talk time: Up to 6 hours 30 minutes
 Standby time: Up to 450 hours
 Music playback: Up to 50 hours
 Video playback: Up to 20 hours

See also 
 Ovi store
 Nokia C7-00
 Nokia 7 plus
 Nokia 8.1

References

External links 
 http://www.nokia.com.au/find-products/all-phones/nokia-x7
 

X7-00
Mobile phones introduced in 2011
Mobile phones with user-replaceable battery
Nokia XSeries

de:Nokia Xseries#Nokia X7